Gusukuma is a Japanese surname that may refer to the following notable people:
Gusukuma Seihō (1614–1644), Japanese royal court painter of the Ryūkyū Kingdom
Gusukuma Seikyū (1542–1612), Japanese bureaucrat of the Ryukyu Kingdom
Gusukuma Shūshin (1507–1585), Japanese bureaucrat of the Ryukyu Kingdom
Shinpan Gusukuma (1890–1954), Okinawan martial artist 

Japanese-language surnames